Benice may refer to the following geographical locations: 

Benice (Prague), a village district of Prague in the Czech Republic
Benice, Greater Poland Voivodeship, a village of Gmina Krotoszyn in Poland
Benice, West Pomeranian Voivodeship, a village of Gmina Kamień Pomorski in Poland
Benice, Martin District, a village and municipality in Martin District, Slovakia